World Patient Safety Day (WPSD), observed annually on 17 September, aims to raise global awareness about patient safety and call for solidarity and united action by all countries and international partners to reduce patient harm. Patient safety focuses on preventing and reducing risks, errors and harm that happen to patients during the provision of health care.

World Patient Safety Day is one of 11 official global public health campaigns marked by the World Health Organization (WHO), along with  World Tuberculosis Day, World Health Day, World Chagas Disease Day, World Malaria Day, World Immunization Week,  World No Tobacco Day, World Blood Donor Day, World Hepatitis Day, World Antimicrobial Awareness Week and World AIDS Day.

Background

Patient safety is a health care discipline that emerged due to the growing complexity of health care systems and the rise of patient harm in health care facilities. Patient harm due to adverse events is one of the leading causes of morbidity and mortality worldwide. The available evidence suggests that hospitalization in low- and middle-income countries leads to 134 million adverse events annually, which in turn result in 2.6 million deaths. In high-income countries, approximately one in ten patients is harmed while receiving hospital care.

World Patient Safety Day was established in May 2019 when the 72nd World Health Assembly  adopted resolution WHA 72.6 on ‘Global action on patient safety’. This global campaign builds on a series of annual Global Ministerial Summits on Patient Safety initiated in 2016, as well as the high-level advocacy and commitment of major international and national stakeholders.

Themes
Each year is dedicated on a different theme.

World Patient Safety Day, September 17th 2021.

2021: Safe and Respectful Maternal and Newborn Care
WHO Patient Safety Flagship is organizing a Global Conference "Together for safe and respectful maternal and newborn care."

2020: Health Worker Safety: A Priority for Patient Safety
"World Patient Safety Day 2020 focuses on the interrelationship between health worker safety and patient safety. The slogan, 'Safe health workers, Safe patients'", emphasizes the need for a safe working environment for health workers as a prerequisite for ensuring patient safety. Along with this slogan, WHO is proposing the following call for action: 'Speak up for health worker safety!'." Health Worker Safety Charter and World Patient Safety Day Goals 2020 were launched on 17 September 2020 to call for action to improve health worker safety globally.

2019: Patient Safety: A Global Health Priority
"The theme for the very first World Patient Safety Day was ‘Patient Safety: A Global Health Priority’. To promote open communication for learning from errors and to emphasize the importance of everyone's voice in prioritizing patient safety, the slogan was 'Speak up for patient safety!'."

Global Observation
A signature mark of the global campaign is the lighting up of prominent monuments, landmarks, and public places in the colour orange, in collaboration with local authorities, all around the world.

See also
Patient safety

References

External links 

 

United Nations days
September events